Kirsten Reitan (born 29 September 1942) is a Norwegian politician for the Socialist Left Party.

She served as a deputy representative to the Norwegian Parliament from Sør-Trøndelag during the term 1993–1997. In total she met during 4 days of parliamentary session.

References

1942 births
Living people
Deputy members of the Storting
Socialist Left Party (Norway) politicians
Sør-Trøndelag politicians
Women members of the Storting
Place of birth missing (living people)
20th-century Norwegian women politicians
20th-century Norwegian politicians